Tomás de Monterroso, O.P. (died 1678) was a Roman Catholic prelate who served as Bishop of Antequera, Oaxaca (1664–1678).

Biography
Tomás de Monterroso  was ordained a priest in the Order of Preachers.
On 23 June 1664, Tomás de Monterroso was appointed during the papacy of Pope Alexander VII as Bishop of Antequera, Oaxaca. 
He served as Bishop of Antequera, Oaxaca until his death on 26 January 1678.

References

External links and additional sources
 (for Chronology of Bishops) 
 (for Chronology of Bishops) 

17th-century Roman Catholic bishops in Mexico
Bishops appointed by Pope Alexander VII
1678 deaths
Dominican bishops